A preacher is someone who preaches sermons.

Preacher or Preachers may also refer to:

Arts and entertainment
 Preacher (comics), a comic book series
 Preacher (TV series), adapted from the comic book
 The Preacher, a book of the Bible, referring to Ecclesiastes, as well as its author
 The Preacher (Dune), a fictional character in the Dune universe
 The Preacher (novel), a sequel to the Swedish novel The Ice Princess
 The Preacher (film), a 2004 Dutch thriller
 Preachers (musical group), a Ghanaian urban gospel group
 "The Preacher" (Horace Silver song), a jazz standard originally recorded in 1955
 "The Preacher", a song on the 1988 album In the Spirit of Things by the progressive rock band Kansas
 "The Preacher", a song on the 2009 album Us by the rapper Brother Ali
 "Preacher", a song on the 2013 album Native by the pop rock band OneRepublic

People
 G. Lloyd Preacher (1882–1972), American architect
 Preacher Roe, nickname of Major League Baseball pitcher Elwin Roe (1916–2008)
 Preacher, nickname of Loyd Roberts (1929–1931), college football and basketball player

Lists of people by nickname